John Quinn (1889 – 3 December 1967) was a New Zealand cricketer. He played in two first-class matches for Wellington in 1913/14.

See also
 List of Wellington representative cricketers

References

External links
 

1889 births
1967 deaths
New Zealand cricketers
Wellington cricketers